The 1959 Preakness Stakes was the 84th running of the $200,000 Preakness Stakes thoroughbred horse race. The race took place on May 16, 1959, and was televised in the United States on the CBS television network. Royal Orbit, who was jockeyed by William Harmatz, won the race by four lengths over runner-up Sword Dancer. Approximate post time was 5:47 p.m. Eastern Time. The race was run on a fast track in a final time of 1:57 flat  The Maryland Jockey Club reported total attendance of 31,506, this is recorded as second highest on the list of American thoroughbred racing top attended events for North America in 1959.

Payout 

The 84th Preakness Stakes Payout Schedule

The full chart 

 Winning Breeder: Louis B. Mayer; (KY)
 Winning Time: 1:57.00
 Track Condition: Fast
 Total Attendance: 31,506

References

External links 
 

1959
1959 in horse racing
1959 in American sports
1959 in sports in Maryland
Horse races in Maryland